Integrated National Security Enforcement Teams (INSET; , EISN) are Canadian counter-terrorist, counter-foreign interference and counter-espionage security forces operating under the auspices of Public Safety Canada. These federal investigative teams were formed in 2002 in response to the September 11 attacks. 

Canadian provinces will have National Security Enforcement Sections (NSES) instead of an INSET in places that do not have a large city.

History
The INSET was formed in 2002 after the 9/11 attacks. Toronto, Montreal, Ottawa and Vancouver NSES units were changed to be INSETs in response to the attacks.

An INSET operating in Toronto played a major role in the capture of 17 terror suspects on June 2, 2006. In 2012, INSETs were tasked to secure Albertan energy infrastructure from all attacks.

On May 6, 2022, the RCMP reported that an INSET team arrested an unnamed individual with officers from the Ontario Provincial Police Provincial Anti-Terrorism Section (OPP PATS) and the Windsor Police Service for contributing to terrorist activity.

Controversies
On April 2022, unnamed RCMP officers have resigned from an INSET unit after they were briefed to arrest a suspect without being told why by CSIS.

Mandate
The mandate of INSETs is as follows:

 Increase the capacity to collect, share and analyze intelligence among partners, with respect to targets (individuals) that are a threat to national security.
 To create an enhanced enforcement capacity to bring such targets to justice.
 Enhance partner agencies' collective ability to combat national security threats and meet specific mandate responsibilities.

Locations
INSET teams are operating in Toronto, Vancouver, Ottawa, Montreal and Edmonton.

Organization
INSETs are made up of personnel from the Royal Canadian Mounted Police (RCMP), Canada Border Services Agency (CBSA), Canadian Security Intelligence Service (CSIS), and police forces at the municipal and provincial levels, are tasked with investigating criminal national security matters domestically and internationally.

See also
 Konrad Shourie

References

Federal departments and agencies of Canada
Security